Helictophanes is a genus of moths belonging to the subfamily Olethreutinae of the family Tortricidae.

Species
Helictophanes argillacea (Clarke, 1976)
Helictophanes myriolychna (Turner, 1946)
Helictophanes prospera (Meyrick, 1909)
Helictophanes scambodes (Meyrick, 1911)
Helictophanes uberana Meyrick, 1881

See also
List of Tortricidae genera

References

External links
tortricidae.com

Tortricidae genera
Olethreutinae
Taxa named by Edward Meyrick